Thongju (Vidhan Sabha constituency) is one of the 60 Vidhan Sabha constituencies in the Indian state of Manipur.

Members of Legislative Assembly 
1967: S . A . Singh, Indian National Congress
1972: Oinam Tomba Singh, Manipur Revolutionary Party
1974: Hawaibam Shyama Singh, Samyukta Socialist Party
1980: Oinam Tomba Singh, Independent
1984: Nameirakpam Bisheshwor, Independent
1995: Sapam Dhananjoy, Manipur Peoples Party 
2000: Sapam Dhananjoy, Manipur State Congress Party 
2002: Bijoy Koijam, Manipur State Congress Party 
2007: Bijoy Koijam, Indian National Congress
 2012: Thongam Biswajit Singh, All India Trinamool Congress
 2015: Thongam Biswajit Singh, Bharatiya Janata Party

Election results

2017 result

2015 by-election

2012 result

See also
 Imphal East district
Manipur Legislative Assembly
List of constituencies of Manipur Legislative Assembly

References

External links
 

Assembly constituencies of Manipur
Imphal East district